Joyful Jukebox Music is a compilation album by American music group the Jackson 5, released by the Motown label on October 26, 1976, after the band had left the label. This is the third compilation released by the group, after Greatest Hits (1971) and Anthology (1976), yet the first to be entirely composed of previously unreleased material, recorded between 1972 and 1975. The compilation was released less than two weeks before the group's debut on their new label Epic Records.

History 
In 1975, the Jackson 5 announced that they were leaving Motown and signed to Epic Records. Before their departure from Motown, they were recording dozens of songs per album. Motown gathered some that had been recorded around the years 1972–1975, for recording sessions and albums: Skywriter, G.I.T.: Get It Together, Dancing Machine and Moving Violation. Those years were very prolific for the Jackson brothers, since in addition to the aforementioned two albums and tracks, Jermaine Jackson, Michael Jackson, and Jackie Jackson each had a solo album at that time (respectively Come into My Life, Music & Me, Jackie Jackson and Forever, Michael).

The albums Joyful Jukebox Music and Boogie were distributed for a very short period, and the album is one of the rarest albums of the Jackson 5, though not as scarce as Boogie. In 2004, it was available for a limited time from Hip-O Select, to complement Motown's 2001 "2 Albums on 1 CD" re-issue set of the Jackson 5's albums, on which some of these songs were issued as bonus tracks. Although only 5,000 copies were pressed, the album contains the previously unreleased full 15+ minute take of the song "Hum Along and Dance."

Track listing

Side One
"Joyful Jukebox Music" (Tom Bee, Michael Edward Campbell) - 3:15 
"Window Shopping" (Clay Drayton, Tamy Smith, Pam Sawyer) - 2:47 
"You're My Best Friend, My Love" (Sam Brown III, Christine Yarian) - 3:24 
"Love is The Thing You Need" (Fonce Mizell, Larry Mizell) - 3:05 
"The Eternal Light" (Mel Larson, Jerry Marcellino) - 3:13

Side Two
"Pride and Joy" (Norman Whitfield, Marvin Gaye, William Stevenson) - 3:13 (Marvin Gaye cover)
"Through Thick and Thin" (Mel Larson, Jerry Marcellino) - 2:42 
"We're Here to Entertain You" (Hal Davis, Nita Garfield, Charlotte O'Hara) - 3:02 
"Make Tonight All Mine" (Freddie Perren, Christine Yarian) - 3:19 
"We're Gonna Change Our Style" (Clay Drayton, Judy Cheeks) - 2:46

Production 

 Cal "RE 20" Harris - mixing engineer
 Jack Andrews - mastering engineer
 Suzee Wendy Ikeda - album direction
 Frank Mulvey - art direction
 Finn Costello - photography
 Gribbitt - graphics

References

External links
 Joyful Jukebox Music Overview at www.jackson5abc.com 

1976 albums
The Jackson 5 albums
Motown albums
Albums produced by Hal Davis
Albums produced by the Corporation (record production team)